Edward Joseph Mulvaney ISO (17 February 18717 June 1951) was a senior Australian public servant, best known for his time heading the Department of Markets and the Department of Commerce.

Life and career
Mulvaney was born in St Kilda, Melbourne on 17 February 1871.

Mulvaney began his career in the public service in the Department of Trade and Customs.

He was the Fourth Member of the Development and Migration Commission between 1928 and 1930.

In May 1930, Mulvany was appointed Secretary of the Department of Markets. He transitioned to head the Department of Commerce in 1932.

Mulvaney announced his retirement in 1934.

Awards
Mulvaney was made a Companion of the Imperial Service Order in June 1927 for service as Secretary of the Commonwealth Markets Department.

References

1871 births
1951 deaths
Australian public servants
Australian Companions of the Imperial Service Order
20th-century Australian public servants
Public servants from Melbourne
People from St Kilda, Victoria